Philippe  Marquis de Villette-Mursay (1627 – 25 December 1707) was a French naval commander.

Biography
He was born in Normandy as the son of Benjamin de Villette (1582–1661) and Louise Arthémise d’Aubigné.Françoise d'Aubigné, the future marquise de Maintenon and second wife of Louis XIV, was his cousin. She lived in his parents' house, the Château de Mursay, and received a Calvinist upbringing until the age of seven.

After a disappointing career in the Army, Villette-Mursay chose a career in the young French Navy under Colbert. In 1672 he was promoted to captain and received in 1674 command of his own ship : l'Apollon.

He first distinguished himself on 8 January 1676 in the Battle of Stromboli against De Ruyter commanding L'Assuré. He again fought in a pitched battle a few months later near Agosta.

In 1680 he sailed to the Caribbean Sea as captain of Les Jeux (36) in the fleet of Jean II d'Estrées. On his return in March 1681, he learned, to his fury, that his children had been converted to Catholicism under influence of Madame de Maintenon. He himself remained Huguenot, which did his career no good.

Finally, the pressure became too great and Villette-Mursay converted to Catholicism, with immediate consequences.
In 1686 he was promoted to squadron-leader and in 1689 to lieutenant-general. In 1697 he received the order of Saint-Louis.
  
In the War of the Grand Alliance, he commanded a squadron in the Battle of Beachy Head where he finished off nine or ten beached Dutch ships.

In the Battles of Barfleur and La Hogue he commanded as vice-admiral a division of 6 ships :
L'Ambitieux, Le Courageux, La Couronne, Le Maure, Le Henry and Le Fort. He was forced to burn L'Ambitieux and Le Fort to avoid capture.

His last battle was the Battle of Málaga where he commanded the vanguard in direct confrontation with Cloudesley Shovell. Villette's ship Le Fier caught fire, and had 100 killed and wounded, but was finally saved.

Marriage and children
In 1662, he married Marie-Anne de Chateauneuf, who died in 1691.In 1695 he married the twenty-years-old Marie-Claire Deschamps de Marsilly, who died in 1750.

He had four children with his first wife :
Constance, married 1724 Jean-Baptiste, Marquis de Montmorin-Saint Hérem.
Philippe II (1667–1706), Marquis De Mursay de Villette, married 1695 Marie-Louise Le Moyne de Villiers, killed in the Siege of Turin.
Henri-Benjamin (1670–1692), married Madeleine de Beaumont de Gibaud, died of his wounds after the Battle of Steenkerque.
Marthe (1673–1729), Marquise de Caylus, married 1686 Anne, Comte de Caylus.
  
He wrote his memoirs -: Mes campagnes de mer sous Louis XIV — avec un dictionnaire des personnages et des batailles (Tallandier, Paris, 1991)

External links
  His memoirs

1627 births
1707 deaths
Military personnel from Normandy
French Navy admirals
Marquesses of Villette-Mursay
French naval commanders in the War of the Spanish Succession
French Roman Catholics
Converts to Roman Catholicism from Calvinism
Philippe